A list of films produced in Argentina in 1954:

External links and references
 Argentine films of 1954 at the Internet Movie Database

1954
Argentine
Films